Henry Howell Secretan (25 February 1855 – 16 June 1911) was an English-born New Zealand cricketer who played first-class cricket for Canterbury from 1877 to 1886.

After attending Marlborough College, Secretan migrated to New Zealand in the 1870s and began working soon after his arrival for the Christchurch office of the New Zealand Loan and Mercantile Agency Company. He worked for the company in several towns in the South Island until 1894, when he helped found the Canterbury Hall Company, acting as secretary until just before his death. As well as being a prominent cricketer, he was one of the pioneers of lawn tennis in the Canterbury region.

Described as "a stylish batsman, with a fine art" and "a beautiful bat, as free as a mountain bird", in his six first-class matches Secretan made a highest score of 72, in an innings victory over Auckland in January 1885, when his teammate Frederick Wilding made 104, only the second century in New Zealand first-class cricket. In 1880-81 Secretan had scored 30 not out, Canterbury's highest score in the match, when the touring Australians beat Canterbury by an innings. The report in the Lyttelton Times said Secretan's innings "made good his claim to be the best batsman in New Zealand".

His first wife, Marion, died in September 1889, aged 29. He married Ellen Coster in July 1890. He died at his home in the Christchurch suburb of Fendalton in June 1911, aged 56.

References

External links
 
Henry Secretan at CricketArchive

1855 births
1911 deaths
People educated at Marlborough College
New Zealand cricketers
Canterbury cricketers
People from Blackheath, London
English emigrants to New Zealand